Lubbock's wrasse, Cirrhilabrus lubbocki, is a species of wrasse native to coral reefs of the Philippines and the island of Sulawesi in Indonesia, though it also has been claimed to be present in Malaysia, Japan, and Palau. It can be found in the aquarium trade.

Named in honor of Hugh Roger Lubbock (1951-1981), marine biologist, who obtained the first specimen and suspected that it represented an undescribed species.

References

External links
 

Cirrhilabrus
Taxa named by John Ernest Randall
Taxa named by Kent E. Carpenter
Fish described in 1980